Sivert Mattsson (September 9, 1907, Edefors, Norrbotten – March 20, 1999) was a Swedish cross-country skier who competed in the 1932 Winter Olympics.

In 1932 he finished eleventh in the 18 km race. He also participated in the 50 km race but did not finish.

Cross-country skiing results

Olympic Games

External links
 Cross-country skiing 1932 

1907 births
1999 deaths
People from Boden Municipality
Cross-country skiers from Norrbotten County
Swedish male cross-country skiers
Olympic cross-country skiers of Sweden
Cross-country skiers at the 1932 Winter Olympics